Benjamin Cooke (born 17 March 1974 in Leeds) is an English stunt performer and actor.

Life 
Cooke started his career in the 1990s as stunt performer. At first, he was acted in numerous television series and movies. For the TV series Hercules he worked as a stunt performer from 1995 until 1998. In 1999, he was involved for the first time as an actor for an episode in the same series.

In 2001, he first starred in the New Zealand production of Snakeskin. In that same year, he contributed as stunt performer in Peter Jackson's literary adaptation of The Lord of the Rings: The Fellowship of the Ring. He was also seen in the sequel that was released one year later. However, he was not mentioned in the credits for his work in neither of the films.

Cooke contributed as stunt performer and actor in Star Wars: Episode III – Revenge of the Sith. In 2006 he was employed as a stunt double for the main actor Daniel Craig in Casino Royale, where he also undertook a short acting role. In the second James Bond, Quantum of Solace, released in 2008, Cooke again appeared as the stunt double for Craig.

Filmography 

Stunt Performer

Actor

Awards 

Screen Actors Guild Award

Taurus World Stunt Awards

References

External links 
 
 Ben Cooke STUNTS

British stunt performers
English male film actors
1974 births
Living people